The Circassian Parliament or the Circassian Majlis (also called the Parliament of Independence) was the legislature of Circassia officialized in 1861 after a meeting in Sochi attended by leaders of several Circassian provinces. A tribal confederation had existed before the parliament's establishment, but a centralized government was achieved only after it was built.

The parliament aimed to defend the western part of Circassia from Russian invasion, and to liberate the occupied Eastern Circassia from the Russian Empire during the Russian-Circassian War. It also sent delegates abroad to gain support for the Circassian struggle internationally.

History

Previous parliament 
The first western-type parliament in Circassia was called in 1820 with 300 people. Important names such as Kizbech Tughuzhuqo were present in the assembly.

1861 parliament 
Being a political resistance council and the legislature of Circassia, the parliament was established in the capital city of Sochi on June 13, 1861 and Qerandiqo Berzeg was elected as the head of the parliament and the nation. Although the Shapsug, Natukhaj, and Ubykh were the main founders, representatives from the Hatuqwai, Abdzakh, Bzhedug, Kabardian and Chemguy regions were also present. Abkhazians and Abazins were also represented in the parliament. Nobles, elders and commanders of all social backgrounds gathered to discuss the immediate need to collaborate and work together regardless of their ideological, ethnic, religious or social divisions for the sake of survival. In an effort to raise awareness, the council formally drafted and declared the independent state of Circassia to the world and immediately sought to have the Circassian nation recognized, as well as redouble efforts to secure arms and material support to finance their self-defense campaigns. They discussed tactics, planned alliances and made efforts to prepare for a last stand (see Qbaada last stand).

The first decisions 
The decisions taken by the parliament were the following:

 The "Independent State of Circassia" is an independent state, as proclaimed once again on this day.
 The established parliament represents all Circassians regardless of tribe.
 Unity will be enforced by force if necessary.
 The initial parliament consists of 15 members.
 The country will be divided into 12 regions, each of which will be appointed administrators responsible for administrative, legal and security, these administrators will act on behalf of the assembly.
 Regional administrators will collect taxes on behalf of the council, the cost of 5 cavalry per 100 households will be charged, and every 100 families will send 5 cavalry to the army. The collected taxes will be spent in the most beneficial way for the country's affairs in the name of the independence of Circassia.
 A government building and guesthouses will be built on behalf of the state administration.
 A justice system will be established immediately to enforce the law.
 Abkhazian, Abazin, and Karachay-Balkar people will be accepted as legitimate equal citizens of Circassia along with Circassians.
 Proper contact with the Circassian and Muslim communities in Constantinople and London will be established.
 Under no circumstances shall Circassia surrender to Russia. Agreements will be made with Russia on equal terms through negotiations; if this is not possible, the war will continue.

Negotiations with Russia 
The parliament government negotiated with the Russian Tsar Alexander II in September 1861 to establish peace, expressing their readiness to accept Russian citizenship.
However, the annexation of Circassia was not enough for the Russian government, as Tsarist government sought to evict the Circassians from the ethnic territory. The Tsar consistently continued the policy of his father, Nicholas I, and rejected the Circassian peace proposals.

After being convinced by his generals, the Russian Tsar declared that Circassia will not only be annexed to Russia unconditionally, but the Circassians will leave, and if the Circassian people do not accept forcefully migrating to Turkey, the Russian generals will see no problem in killing all Circassians. He gave the Circassian representatives a month to decide.

Delegations to major powers 
The parliament did not accept leaving their lands and sent delegations to the Ottoman Empire and the United Kingdom to gain support from both countries, arguing that they are being massacred and they would be forced into exile soon. 

Ottoman and British delegations both promised recognition of an independent Circassia, as well as possible recognition from Paris, if they unified into a coherent state. 

In Turkey, a special committee on Circassian affairs was created, and received donations from the local Muslim folk, and allegedly even from the sultan himself, secretly. However, the economically and politically weakened Ottoman Empire could not contribute further in protecting the Circassians.

Before any result was achieved, in 1862, as a result of the fall of Sochi, the parliament was dissolved and almost all of its leaders eliminated, and the resistance moved to the Caucasus mountains, new parliament meetings started to be held in Mutikhwa (Мутыхуа, now in the village of "Plastunki"), the last meeting was held in Qbaada before the parliament took its last decision, which was to not surrender, and the Battle of Qbaada was fought. The area fell, all insurgents were massacred by the Russian army, which announced its victory on 21 May 1864.

See also
Circassian genocide

References

Further reading
Richmond, Walter. The Circassian Genocide, Rutgers University Press, 2013. 

Circassians
Peoples of the Caucasus
1861 establishments in the Russian Empire